Luxemburger Volksblatt was a far-right newspaper published in Luxembourg between 1933 and 1941.

References

Defunct newspapers published in Luxembourg
German-language newspapers published in Luxembourg
1933 establishments in Luxembourg
1941 disestablishments in Luxembourg
Publications established in 1933
Publications disestablished in 1941